William George Kern (born February 28, 1933) is a retired American Major League Baseball outfielder.  After nine seasons in minor league baseball, Kern had an eight-game trial with the Kansas City Athletics during the  season. He had signed with the team in 1954, when they were still based in Philadelphia.  Kern attended Muhlenberg College, graduating in 1954.

He batted over .300 four times and hit 144 home runs during his minor-league career. In September 1962, at age 29, he was recalled by the Athletics after he batted .315 with 27 home runs and 97 runs batted in for the Triple-A Portland Beavers. Kern appeared in eight games played, batting 16 times with four hits. In his first MLB game, he pinch hit for Moe Drabowsky and singled off Dick Donovan of the Cleveland Indians. In his final MLB game, as the A's starting leftfielder, he hit his lone Major League home run off future Baseball Hall of Fame pitcher (and United States Senator) Jim Bunning, then with the Detroit Tigers.

References

External links

1933 births
Living people
Albany Senators players
Baseball players from Pennsylvania
Burlington A's players
Columbia Gems players
Columbus Jets players
Hopkinsville Hoppers players
Indianapolis Indians players
Kansas City Athletics players
Lancaster Red Roses players
Little Rock Travelers players
Major League Baseball outfielders
Muhlenberg Mules baseball players
Portland Beavers players
Shreveport Sports players
Sportspeople from Lehigh County, Pennsylvania
Toronto Maple Leafs (International League) players